Catona (in the local dialect A Catùna) is an urban district (independent municipality until 1927) of Reggio Calabria, Italy, as part of the 8th district with neighborhoods Salice, Villa San Giuseppe and Rosalì. With about 15,000 inhabitants it is in the coastal area the northernmost district of the city, it borders to the north with Villa San Giovanni, to the south with Gallico; it overlooks the Strait of Messina. Etymology: Katà ta bounà> Kat'vouna> Catuna. "Byzantine" and modern Greek. "Under the mountains".

History
In Roman times it is believed that there was located the boarding station for Sicily called "ad fretum ad statuam". In fact, the Roman Via Popilia reached Catona. In 1283 it was devastated during the war of Vespers. Dante Alighieri, in canto VIII of Paradiso, mentions the district of Catona:

Through the story of Charles Martel of Anjou, Dante describes the kingdom as a triangle between Bari East, West and Gaeta Catona South.

In the Middle Ages, Catona was a fortress and was the theater of a war between the Angevins and Aragonese. For Dante, "Ausonia" is synonymous with Italy.

In addition, also Giovanni Boccaccio, in a note from Dante Alighieri’s Commedia, mentions Catona:

Events
Catonateatro is important in the cultural landscape of Reggio Calabria, offering theatrical and musical events each year at "Arena Bianchi" on the "Catona  promenade".
The anniversary of the procession dedicated to Saint Francis of Paola is very important and it takes place on the second Sunday following  Easter Sunday, as well the procession of the Sacred Hearts of Jesus and Mary in summer. Also, in summer there is the Latin sailing festival of the strait, the corricatona and the Eggplant Festival in Salice.

Tourism
Catona beach, 1.5 km long, is among the sites of Community importance, that is places of considerable environmental interest in the EEC (Catona Beach IT9350183); formed by a white sand of medium garnet color and is pleasant for the swimmer. The sea is transparent, crystal clear, cold and normally calm (unless there is a Sirocco wind). The beach of Catona has one feature: just dig a hole in the sand to find fresh water, even on the coast.

Legend
In 1464 St. Francis of Paula was refused passage by a boatman while trying to cross the Strait of Messina to Sicily. He reportedly laid his cloak on the water, tied one end to his staff as a sail, and sailed across the strait with his companions following in the boat. A description of the event is known nell'arazzo Edward Steinle, is preserved in the Vatican, in the gallery of the maps.

The Convent of the Minims, built in 1629, after several reconstructions, is found in Catona. "The miracle of St. Francis" is remembered in Catona promenade with a monument of considerable size (about 15 m) of G. Polimeni. Another sandstone monument represents the saint. Sculpted in 1702 it was initially placed where the miracle happened. After the extension of the promenade, the monumental work was moved a hundred meters from the water line on private property and is no longer available for visitors.

Notables
 Servant of God Sister , who founded the Religious Institute of the Daughters of Mary Immaculate, which inspired the birth of the movement of the Church of the Friends of Mary Immaculate.
 Antonino Barillà, football player for the Reggina Calcio.

Places of worship
 St. Denis Church
 St. Francis of Paola Basilica (within which is shown a picture of the contemporary Calabrian painter Giuseppe Mainieri)
 St. Aurelius Bishop and Martyr Church (Arghillà)
 St. Mary of Good Counsel Church (Concessa)

Statues and Memorials
 Monument to sailors fallen into the sea
Built in 2000 by the sculptor Gennaro Carresi.

 War memorial
Built in 1937, the monument consists of a quadrangular base where the pedestal rests with the inscription of the names of the fallen of the 
First World War; on top there is the eagle with its wings outstretched, while on the left there is the allegory of victory. It is located in 
Piazza Matteotti Catona.

 War memorial
Located in Rosalí

 Monument Dante Alighieri

 Monument San Francesco di Paola
Monument of considerable size (about 15m) by G. Polimeni

 Bust Dr. Walter Flesca
Located on the seafront, made by the sculptor Rosario La Seta

 Monumental fountain
Located in Villa San Giuseppe and built in 1875.

References

External links
 Catonateatro Official Website
 Volley Catona website

Reggio Calabria
Neighbourhoods in Italy